Elshan Gambarov (Azeri: Elşən Qəmbərov; born 30 October 1972) is a former Azerbaijani footballer (midfielder) who last played for FK Gäncä. He was also a member of Azerbaijan national football team.

External links 

1972 births
Living people
Azerbaijani footballers
Azerbaijan international footballers
Azerbaijani expatriate footballers
Association football midfielders
FC Anzhi Makhachkala players
Simurq PIK players
Navbahor Namangan players
FC Kyzylzhar players
Turan-Tovuz IK players
FK Dinamo Samarqand players
Footballers from Baku
Neftçi PFK players